Kingbeare is a hamlet in the parish of North Hill, Cornwall, England.

References

Hamlets in Cornwall